Ambonus is a genus of beetles in the family Cerambycidae, containing the following species:

 Ambonus albomaculatus (Burmeister, 1865)
 Ambonus distinctus (Newman, 1840)
 Ambonus electus (Gahan in Gahan & Arrow, 1903)
 Ambonus interrogationis (Blanchard in Orbigny, 1847)
 Ambonus lippus (Germar, 1824)
 Ambonus proximus (Berg, 1889)
 Ambonus variatus (Newman, 1841)
 Ambonus yucatanus (Fuchs, 1961)

References

Elaphidiini